Artanis may refer to:
 Artanis (StarCraft), a fictional character in the StarCraft series and Heroes of the Storm
 Artanis, an alias for Galadriel, a character in J. R. R. Tolkien's Middle-earth Legendarium
 Artanis Entertainment Group, a movie production and licensing company owned by the estate of the late entertainer Frank Sinatra ("Artanis" is "Sinatra" spelled backwards)